Porina huainamdungensis is a species of lichen in the family Trichotheliaceae. Known from Thailand, where it grows in lower-elevation montane rainforests, it was described as new to science in 2011. The specific epithet refers to the type locality, Huai Nam Dang National Park in Chiang Mai Province.

References

Lichens described in 2011
Lichen species
Lichens of Thailand
Gyalectales
Taxa named by Robert Lücking